Gabba is a London-based British tribute band performing ABBA songs in the stripped down punk style of the Ramones, a style of pop punk they dubbed discopunk and claim to have invented. They formed in 1996 and took their name in 1999. They have released one album .

History

Gabba was informally formed in 1996 by Stig Honda, alleged "professor at the Osaka Rock 'n' Roll High School", who enrolled five students from all over the world to fuse the disco pop of Abba and the punk rock of the Ramones, creating "disco-punk". 

In 1999, the band took its name of "GABBA, The Discopunk Sensation". The name is an acrostic on the members' nicknames, echoing both the "gabba gabba hey!" chorus from the Ramones' song "Pinhead" and the name of ABBA.

Their second recording and official debut album, the CD Leave Stockholm (1999), was produced by Stigma Records (UK) and sub-distributed by Rough Trade Records.

According to a band statement, " [In 2001] GABBA release their complex 3rd album, the Spanish language "Tijuana Dance". However, the album was banned and withdrawn from sale after just 1 week for being "Anti-Establishment", due to some confusion over Bee Bee's appalling Spanish translations which inadvertently accused the Queen of England of being a Nazi Stormtrouper (in a stupor, no less). It is unclear if the album will ever be released again. "

Some of the facts on their Internet Website are similar to real facts of ABBA and Ramones:
 They write that they wanted to win the European Snog Contest, but they got the wrong application form, so they won the Eurovision Song Contest. This is the reference to the Eurovision Song Contest 1974, which ABBA won.
 The song for the "wrong" contest was "Ring Ring", "which was basically 'Sing Sing (Like Joey Ramone)' but with new lyrics by Neil Sedated". ABBA tried first time to be at the contest in 1973 with "Ring Ring", but they were sent out in the national vote.
 Also about the Spanish language album Tijuana Dance. ABBA had recorded an album in Spanish.
 This GABBA-album was banned cause of lyrics about a "Nazi Stormtrouper" (referencing "Today Your Love, Tomorrow the World"). In 1980 ABBA was very popular in Russia (Soviet Union), until "Super Trouper". A radio announcer translated the title of the song word-by-word on air. He translated it as a Super (like "perfect", "very good" etc.) Trouper (Trouper from Stormtrouper).
 Once in the news in 2005 the site wrote: Geeky & Bjoey haven't spoken for almost 5 years. In fact Joey Ramone and Johnny Ramone didn't talk since Johnny married Joey's girlfriend, an incident which led Joey to write "The KKK Took My Baby Away"
 In reference to the website, in New York is a musical based on the songs of GABBA called "Papa Mao Mao", which of course is a reference to both "Mamma Mia" and the backing vocals (Papa-Oom-Mow-Mow) of the Ramones' version of the Trashmen's "Surfin' Bird".

Media attention
They have been aired mostly in the UK, on Steve Lamacq's BBC Radio 1 The Evening Session, on BBC Television's The Beat Room, on BBC Radio Scotland's The Beat Patrol, and webcast on Virtue TV (now Interoute TV). 

They have been written about in magazines such as Mojo, Melody Maker, NME, Time Out, Music365.com, CMJ New Music Monthly, The Ramones UK Fan Club Newsletter, and the London Evening Standard.

They have played along bands such as Negativland, The Rezillos, and Chicks on Speed, in various outlets in London, and at the 1999 Christmas parties of Rough Trade Records and Fierce Panda Records.

In related media, their autobiographical musical short film "Gimme Gimme Shock Treatment" (written and directed by Cliff Homow, alias "Cliffy Hormone", and Midge Devitt) won the 2003 "Special Independent Film Award" at London's counterculture Portobello Film Festival.

Members
 On stage, acrostically

 Geeky (Japan) - guitar (represents Johnny Ramone)
 Anneky (Sweden) - vocals, chorus (represents Agnetha Fältskog)
 Bjöey (US) - lead vocals (represents Björn Ulvaeus and Joey Ramone)
 Bee Bee (Germany) - bass, vocals (represents Benny Andersson and Dee Dee Ramone)
 Abby (German from Thailand) - drums, vocals, chorus (represents Anni-Frid Lyngstad and Tommy Ramone)

 Backstage

 Stig Honda (Japan) - business manager, lyrics (represents Stig Anderson, ABBA manager)
 Phil Smegma (UK) - production manager (represents Phil Ramone and Phil Spector, Ramones producers)
 Monte Malmönik (Sweden) - road manager (represents Monte Melnick, Ramones roadie)

(The countries of origin are alleged by the members, who could possibly be all British.)

Discography
 Albums
 (1999) Leave Stockholm (CD out-of-print, now in MP3s and BitTorrent)

 Singles and songs on compilations
 (2001) "Gabba Gabba" on Life's a Gas (international tribute album to Joey Ramone)
 (2005) "Gabba Gabba" single on iTunes UK

References

External links
 Official links
 [archived on the Internet Archive Wayback Machine] 

 Resource links

ABBA tribute bands
English pop punk groups
Musical groups from London
Musical groups established in 1996
Alumni of the University of Brighton